A.R.C. is a collaborative album credited to the trio of pianist Chick Corea, bassist Dave Holland and drummer Barry Altschul, recorded and released in 1971 by the ECM label. The same trio featured on Corea's previous album The Song of Singing, as did an earlier version of “Nefertiti” by Wayne Shorter. The album title stands for "affinity, reality, communication," a term from Scientology, with which Corea had recently become involved.
This is the first project in Holland’s long association with ECM.

Reception 
The AllMusic review by Scott Yanow awarded the album 4 stars, stating, "This LP features pianist Chick Corea, bassist Dave Holland and drummer Barry Altschul during the brief period that, along with Anthony Braxton, they were members of the fine avant-garde quartet Circle. The music heard on this set is not quite as free as Circle's but often very explorative... a very viable set of adventurous jazz, recorded just a few months before Corea changed direction".

Track listing
All compositions by Chick Corea except as indicated
 "Nefertiti" (Wayne Shorter) – 9:40
 "Ballad for Tillie" (Barry Altschul, Chick Corea, David Holland) – 5:28
 "A.R.C." – 5:41
 "Vedana" (Holland) – 7:32
 "Thanatos" – 4:33
 "Games" – 7:39

Recorded in Tonstudio Bauer, Ludwigsburg, West Germany on January 11, 12 & 13, 1971

Personnel
 Chick Corea – acoustic piano
 David Holland – bass
 Barry Altschul – drums, percussions
 Engineer: Kurt Rapp
 Producer: Manfred Eicher
 Cover design by B & B Wojirsch

See also
 Circle - A group featuring Corea, Holland and Altschul.

References

External links 
 Chick Corea, David Holland, Barry Altschul - A.R.C. (1971) album review by Scott Yanow, credits & releases at AllMusic
 Chick Corea, David Holland, Barry Altschul - A.R.C. (1971) album releases & credits at Discogs
 Chick Corea, David Holland, Barry Altschul - A.R.C. (1971) album to be listened as stream on Spotify

ECM Records albums
Chick Corea albums
Dave Holland albums
Barry Altschul albums
1971 albums
Albums produced by Manfred Eicher
Avant-garde jazz albums